Lena Nazaryan (born 9 March 1983) is an Armenian politician and a member of the Armenian National Assembly. As a board member of the Civil Contract Party, she ran under the Way Out Alliance (Yelk) during the 2017 parliamentary election and was elected off the Yelk national list.

On April 11, 2018, she joined Ararat Mirzoyan in lighting smoke flares in the National Assembly to call attention to the protests against the transition of Serzh Sargsyan from President to Prime Minister.  The protests did eventually result in Sargsyan's resignation.

Professional career 
Prior to running as a political candidate, Nazaryan worked as a journalist for Hetq and as the coordinator for election programs at the Armenian branch of Transparency International.  In 2013, she received the Freedom of Speech Award from the Asparez Journalists' Club.

References 

 My Step nominates Lena Nazaryan for Vice Speaker of Parliament

Living people
1983 births
Members of the National Assembly (Armenia)
Politicians from Yerevan
21st-century Armenian women politicians
21st-century Armenian politicians
Members of the 7th convocation of the National Assembly (Armenia)
Civil Contract (Armenia) politicians